Zus Engelenberg (4 January 1909 – 16 May 1984) was a South African swimmer. She competed in the women's 100 metre freestyle event at the 1928 Summer Olympics.

References

External links
 

1909 births
1984 deaths
Olympic swimmers of South Africa
Swimmers at the 1928 Summer Olympics
Sportspeople from Pretoria
South African female freestyle swimmers
20th-century South African women